Dracula and Son is a 1976 French comedy horror film directed and written by Édouard Molinaro. The film is about a vampire father and son. Christopher Lee reprises his role as Count Dracula from the Hammer Films Dracula film series (in total, this was the 9th and final time Lee played the role of Dracula on film).

Plot
With angry villagers driving them away from their castle in Transylvania, Count Dracula (Christopher Lee) and his son Ferdinand (Bernard Ménez) head abroad. The Prince of Darkness ends up in London, England where he becomes a horror movie star exploiting his vampire status.  His son, meanwhile, is ashamed of his roots and ends up a night watchman in Paris, France where he falls for Nicole, a French girl.  Naturally, tensions arise when father and son are reunited and both take a liking to the same girl.

Cast 
 Christopher Lee as Count Dracula
 Bernard Ménez as Ferdinand Poitevin
 Marie-Hélène Breillat as Nicole Clement
 Catherine Breillat as Herminie Poitevin
 Bernard Alane as Jean
 Jean-Claude Dauphin as Cristéa
 Anna Gael as Miss Gaylor
 Raymond Bussières as L'homme âgé à l'ANPE
 Mustapha Dali as Khaleb
 Xavier Depraz as Le majordome
 Marthe Villalonga as The Subway Woman

Release
Dracula and Son was released in France on 15 September 1976. It was released in 1979 in the United States. The American distributor of the film cut many jokes in the film and replaced them with different gags.

Reception
Allmovie gave the film a rating of two stars out of five, but noted that "this was a very witty film prior to its decimation by an uncaring American distributor. A review in TV Guide gave a positive review of three stars out of four, noting that the film "actually works because it treats its subject with respect and doesn't degrade it for cheap, campy laughs." while noting that the film has a "poor dubbing job" that made the character Ferdinand Poitevin sound like a cross between Woody Allen and Austin Pendleton.

See also
 Christopher Lee filmography
 List of comedy films of the 1970s
 List of French films of 1976
 List of horror films of 1976

Notes

References

External links 
 

1970s comedy horror films
1976 films
Dracula films
French comedy horror films
French vampire films
Films directed by Édouard Molinaro
Films scored by Vladimir Cosma
Vampire comedy films
1970s French films